Yongning is a town under the administration of Wafangdian, Liaoning, China. , it has 18 villages under its administration.

See also 
 List of township-level divisions of Liaoning

References 

Towns in Liaoning
Wafangdian